The 2003 Infineon Grand Prix of Sonoma was the third race of the 2003 American Le Mans Series season.  It took place at Infineon Raceway, California on July 27, 2003.

This race marked the first time in American Le Mans Series history since the introduction of the two separate Le Mans Prototype classes in 2001 that the smaller of the two won a race overall.  The LMP675 class Dyson Lola-MG defeated the LMP900 class Joest Audi by a margin of 3.7 seconds.

Official results
Class winners in bold.  Cars failing to complete 75% of winner's distance marked as Not Classified (NC).

Statistics
 Pole Position - #16 Dyson Racing - 1:23.085
 Fastest Lap - #16 Dyson Racing - 1:24.229
 Distance - 415.307 km
 Average Speed - 150.145 km/h

External links
  
 Race Results

S
Grand Prix of Sonoma
Grand Prix of Sonoma